The 1934 Avusrennen was a non-championship Grand Prix held on 27 May 1934 at AVUS in Berlin, Germany. It was the 10th race of the 1934 Grand Prix season. The race, which was 15 laps, was won by Guy Moll driving an Alfa Romeo Tipo B/P3 after starting from 9th place.

Background 
The race was highly anticipated due to the new Auto Union and Mercedes-Benz cars making their first public appearances. Although the Mercedes cars had to withdraw after Practice due to an issue that meant that the fuel pump did not deliver fuel sufficiently at high speed, the top Auto Union car finished 3rd, just 1 minute and 45 seconds behind 1st place. The race saw record crowds of an estimated 200,000 spectators including top German ministers such as Adolf Hühnlein, the German Motorsport leader, who started the race. It also marked the sudden return of Rudolf Caracciola who fractured his thigh in Practice for the 1933 Manx Grand Prix and announced his retirement from racing shortly after. Tazio Nuvolari also announced his intention to race despite his left leg still being in plaster after breaking it at the 1934 Alessandria Circuit on the 21st of April.

Entries

Starting grid 
The starting grid was determined by ballot and was reduced to 11 cars following the withdrawal of Daimler-Benz due to a fuel pump problem and Bugatti as the cars were not ready.

Race 
The race was started in wet conditions by Adolf Hühnlein at 4:00PM.

Hans Stuck had a strong start, having a lead of over 48 seconds by the end of the first lap, which increased to 73 seconds by the end of the second lap. Eugenio Siena retired on the third lap due to a mechanical issue. By lap 4 the rain had stopped and the track began drying out. Stuck's lead had dropped to 60 seconds. By the 7th lap the track was almost dry and Stuck was still in the lead, and would continue to do so until lap 11 when he stopped for a change of tyres and to refuel, the stop lasted 1 minute and 22 seconds. Moll passed Stuck during his pit stop and Stuck rejoined 2nd. On lap 12 Stuck retired due to a clutch issue. On the last lap, Achille Varzi had suffered a puncture before the finish line, he was able to finish slowly and retained 2nd position.

Guy Moll won the race with an average speed of 205 km/h. Achille Varzi, who won the 1933 race came in second with an average speed of 201 km/h.

References 

1934 in German motorsport
1934 in Grand Prix racing